The 1956–57 San Francisco Dons men's basketball team represented the University of San Francisco as a member of the West Coast Athletic Conference during the 1956–57 NCAA men's basketball season. The Dons carried a 55-game unbeaten streak into the season, extending it to a then NCAA record 60-game winning streak. After falling out of the rankings, San Francisco battled back to finish the season with a 21–7 record (12–2 CBA) and reach their third consecutive Final Four. After losing to Kansas in the national semifinals, USF defeated Michigan State in the third-place game.

Roster

Schedule and results

|-
!colspan=9 style=| Regular season

|-
!colspan=9 style=| NCAA tournament

Rankings

Team players drafted into the NBA

References

San Francisco
San Francisco Dons men's basketball seasons
NCAA Division I men's basketball tournament Final Four seasons
San Francisco
San Francisco Dons
San Francisco Dons